The 1936 UCLA Bruins football team was an American football team that represented the University of California, Los Angeles during the 1936 college football season.  In their 12th year under head coach William H. Spaulding, the Bruins compiled a 6–3–1 record (4–3–1 conference) and finished in fifth place in the Pacific Coast Conference.

Schedule

Notes

References

UCLA
UCLA Bruins football seasons
UCLA Bruins football